Zinc finger protein 229 is a protein that in humans is encoded by the ZNF229 gene.

References

Further reading